Mitsinjo is a rural municipality in western Madagascar. It belongs to the district of Sakaraha, which is a part of Atsimo-Andrefana. The population of the municipality was 4168 in 2019.

References

Populated places in Melaky